

Head coach:

Head coach:

Head coach: Janos Ziegler

1 Gyorgy Elbert
2 Jozsef Szabados
3 Peter Lipcsei
4 Jozsef Csanyi
5 Gabor Greczi
6 Gabor Wendler
7 Attila Jezsek
8 Gabor Halmai
9 Attila Szabo
10 Zsolt Bencze
11 Zsolt Kasic
12 Ferenc Szilveszter
13 Balazs Beko
14 Tamas Szonyi
15 Gusztav Vajda
18 Janos Vamos

Head coach:  Carlos Queiroz

Head coach: Maurice Setters

(N°5)John Carroll DF 13/10/1971 Liverpool F.C. England
(N°12)Jason Byrne FW 16/05/1972 Huddersfield F.C. England

Head coach:  Gennadi Kostylev

Head coach:  Chus Pereda

Head coach:

References

UEFA European Under-19 Championship squads